Kevin Carlberg (April 28, 1977 – August 29, 2009) was an American vocalist and acoustic guitarist. Carlberg is best known as the vocalist and acoustic guitarist of Pseudopod. He completed a solo CD with producer Dito Godwin.

Carlberg was diagnosed with brain cancer. He enrolled in an experimental immuno-therapy treatment at UCLA called the dendritic cell vaccine and after 5 years of remission, the tumor had not returned.

On September 5, 2008 Carlberg was featured on the one-hour "Stand Up 2 Cancer" tele-cast and has been the subject of other notable news casts and articles.

On August 29, 2009, Carlberg died from brain cancer.

Discography

1998: Pseudopod (band), Pod
2001: Pseudopod (band), Rest Assured, Bonobo Records
2002: Pseudopod (band), Pseudopod, Interscope 
2003: Kevin Carlberg & Friends, When The Muse Visits, Twinner Records
2006: Steps For Living, I'm Too Young for This, Benefit CD Track 5 - Been There
2007: Kevin Carlberg, The Man Just Like Me, Unknown
2008: Kevin Carlberg, Kevin Carlberg, Independent Release

References

External links
Stand Up to Cancer Official Site
Kevin Carlberg Official Site
Kevin Carlberg at MySpace

2009 deaths
1977 births
20th-century American guitarists